Bakhtemir is a rural locality (a selo) and the administrative center of Bakhtemirsky Selsoviet of Ikryaninsky District, Astrakhan Oblast, Russia. The population was 2,532 as of 2010. There are 38 streets.

Geography 
Bakhtemir is located 12 km northeast of Ikryanoye (the district's administrative centre) by road. Novo-Bulgary is the nearest rural locality.

References 

Rural localities in Ikryaninsky District